Robert II (September 1250 – 11 July 1302) was the Count of Artois, the posthumous son and heir of Robert I and Matilda of Brabant. He was a nephew of Louis IX of France. He died at the Battle of the Golden Spurs.

Life
An experienced soldier, he took part in the Aragonese Crusade and attempted an invasion of Sicily in 1287. In 1288, Robert began work on a great park at Hesdin. The park contained a menagerie, aviaries, fishponds, orchards, an enclosed garden and facilities for tournaments. It also contained mechanical statues including waving monkeys draped in skins.

He defeated the Flemings in 1297 at the Battle of Furnes. He was again sent into Flanders in July 1302, where he began to ravage the countryside and attempted to take the town of Kortrijk (Courtrai).

Battle of the Golden Spurs
He then met the Flemish army at the Battle of the Golden Spurs. His infantry advanced with great success against the Flemings (mostly city militia), but he ordered their recall to allow his cavalry to make the final, victorious charge. But on the broken, marshy ground, his knights were unable to gain enough momentum to break the Flemish shieldwall, and they were knocked down and slaughtered. Robert led some of the reserves in a second charge in an attempt to reverse their fortunes. Artois was unhorsed by Willem van Saeftinghe. He and his troops were cut down by the Flemish infantry.

Family
In 1262, in Paris, Robert married Amicie de Courtenay (1250–1275), daughter of Pierre de Courtenay, Seigneur de Conches, a great-grandson of Louis VI, and Perronelle de Joigny. They had three children:
 Mahaut (1268–1329)
 Philip (1269–1298)
 Robert (born 1271, died young).

After Amicie's death, Robert married twice more: first, in 1277, to Agnes of Dampierre (1237–1288), heiress of Bourbon, and then, on 18 October 1298 to Margaret (died 1342), daughter of John II, Count of Hainaut. After Robert's death, his daughter Mahaut inherited Artois, but his grandson Robert III unsuccessfully tried to claim it.

In popular culture 
Robert II and his "contrivances for amusement" at Hesdin are depicted in the segment "You’ve Been Artois’d!" from Horrible Histories, season 3, episode 1.

References

Sources

External links
 Coat of Arms in the Wijnbergen Roll

1250 births
1302 deaths
Counts of Artois
House of Artois
French military personnel killed in action
13th-century peers of France
14th-century peers of France